American slang is slang that is common in, or particular to, the United States.

The term can refer specifically to:

Language
California slang, slang used in California English, or which originates in California
Hawaiian Pidgin, English-based Creole Language spoken in Hawaii
U.S. Navy slang, a glossary at Wiktionary
African American Vernacular English, a source of American slang words
The Historical Dictionary of American Slang, the most comprehensive and thoroughly researched dictionary of American slang and the only American slang dictionary prepared entirely on historical principles

Music
American Slang, a 2010 album by rock group The Gaslight Anthem

See also
Regional vocabularies of American English